Dorudontinae are a group of extinct cetaceans that are related to Basilosaurus.

Classification 
 Subfamily Dorudontinae
 Genus Ancalecetus
 Ancalecetus simonsi
 Genus Chrysocetus
 Chrysocetus fouadassii
 Chrysocetus healyorum
 Genus Cynthiacetus
 Cynthiacetus maxwelli
 Cynthiacetus peruvianus
 Genus Dorudon
 Dorudon atrox
 Dorudon serratus
 Genus Masracetus
 Masracetus markgrafi
 Genus Saghacetus
 Saghacetus osiris
 Genus Stromerius
 Stromerius nidensis
 Genus Zygorhiza
 Zygorhiza kochii

Notes

References 

 

Basilosauridae